Jaime Piqueras Sánchez Concha (born 8 January 1927) is a Peruvian retired athlete. He competed in the men's pole vault at the 1948 Summer Olympics.

References

External links
 

1927 births
Living people
Athletes (track and field) at the 1948 Summer Olympics
Peruvian male pole vaulters
Olympic athletes of Peru
Place of birth missing (living people)
Pan American Games medalists in athletics (track and field)
Pan American Games silver medalists for Peru
Athletes (track and field) at the 1951 Pan American Games
Medalists at the 1951 Pan American Games
20th-century Peruvian people